Mateo Hernández (born 5 October 1998) is an Argentine professional footballer who plays as a midfielder for Real Tomayapo.

Club career

Colón
Hernández started his career with Argentine Primera División side Colón. He made his professional debut on 30 November 2018 under interim manager Esteban Fuertes, who substituted the midfielder on for Leonardo Heredia in the second half of a fixture with Belgrano. Hernández made six further appearances in 2018–19, which included his Copa Sudamericana bow against Peruvian club Deportivo Municipal. After not featuring competitively in 2019–20, Hernández departed in October 2020.

York United
On 20 October 2020, Hernández signed with Canadian Premier League team York United. On 12 May 2021, he was loaned to Liga Dominicana de Fútbol side Atlético Pantoja until December 2021. On June 2 he moved on loan with fellow York teammate Lisandro Cabrera to Guadalupe of Costa Rica.

Real Tomayapo
In December 2022, York United announced Hernández had been transferred to Real Tomayapo of the División Profesional.

Personal life
In March 2020, Hernández was hospitalised and diagnosed with the lowest form of dengue fever; he had contracted the disease following a trip to Paraguay.

Career statistics
.

References

External links

1998 births
Living people
Footballers from Santa Fe, Argentina
Argentine footballers
Association football midfielders
Argentine expatriate footballers
Expatriate soccer players in Canada
Argentine expatriate sportspeople in Canada
Expatriate footballers in the Dominican Republic
Argentine expatriate sportspeople in the Dominican Republic
Expatriate footballers in Costa Rica
Argentine expatriate sportspeople in Costa Rica
Argentine Primera División players
Liga Dominicana de Fútbol players
Liga FPD players
Canadian Premier League players
Club Atlético Colón footballers
York United FC players
Atlético Pantoja players
Guadalupe F.C. players